The Mainichi Film Award for Best Art Direction is a film award given at the Mainichi Film Awards.

List of winners

References

Art Direction
Awards established in 1947
1947 establishments in Japan
Lists of films by award
Awards for best art direction